Łódzka Kolej Aglomeracyjna (Łódź Metropolitan Railway) is a commuter and regional rail service operating between the Polish city of Łódź and surrounding towns in the Łódź Voivodeship (province).

The company was founded in 2010. It is fully owned by the Łódź Voivodeship government.

Services 

The Railway operates services to destinations between Łódź and the following towns and cities:
Koluszki, 
Kutno, 
Łowicz, 
Sieradz, 
Skierniewice,
Zgierz.

On weekends, services operate between Łódź and the Warszawa Wschodnia railway station in Warsaw.

The main termini stations of the network are Łódź Kaliska, Zgierz and Łódź Widzew. 
Services are operated on railway tracks owned by PKP Polskie Linie Kolejowe, which are shared with other rail operators. 
The central sections of ŁKA form a circular line encircling the city of Łódź, running between Łódź Kaliska railway station and the Widzew railway station in the Łódź suburb of Widzew, the town of Zgierz, and concluding at Łódź Kaliska railway station. Although the system maps and timetables depict a circular line, in reality, there is no service that runs continually around the city. Instead, commuters must catch trains travelling to an outlying destination, and change at one of the three main stations to continue travelling around the circular line.

History 
The company was established in May 2010 by the Łódź Voivodeship Government.

The Voivodeship undertook a major rail upgrade program worth €72m, 50% of which was funded by the European Union. The program involved upgrading rail tracks and existing railway stations, constructing new railway stations at a number of regional locations, and undertaking a major reconstruction of the existing station in Widzew. A new train maintenance depot was also constructed in Widzew. The program also involved improving bus connections, building park and ride facilities, ticket facilities, and purchasing a fleet of 20 new trains.

The Railway commenced operation on June 15, 2014.

The Voivodeship Government has indicated that it intends to purchase 14 more trains and extend services to Radom, Piotrków Trybunalski, Skierniewice, Bełchatów and Złoczew. 

On 11 December 2018, the company launched a new route between Skierniewice and Łowicz (extended to Kutno on 15 December 2019), and on 10 March 2019 it launched new routes from Łódź Fabryczna station to Piotrków Trybunalski, Radomsko and Tomaszów Mazowiecki.

Rolling stock 

ŁKA began operations with an order of 20 Stadler FLIRT two-car EMUs, which entered service starting in 2014 and were delivered through early 2015.  
In September 2016, Stadler was named the preliminary winner of a contract to supply 14 three-car EMUs, but after a legal challenge from Newag, the latter was in February 2017 awarded the contract for its Impuls II EMU, the first of which entered service in December 2018. Also, 10 of 20 FLIRT EMUs are scheduled to be elongated into three-car form.

Lines

ŁÓDŹ CIRCULAR LINE (Purple)

ŁÓDŹ - KUTNO (Red)

ŁÓDŹ  - SIERADZ (Orange)

ŁÓDŹ - ŁOWICZ (Blue)

ŁÓDŹ – KOLUSZKI - SKIERNIEWICE - WARSZAWA (Green)

SKIERNIEWICE - KUTNO LINE (Dark Blue)

ŁÓDŹ – KOLUSZKI - PIOTRKÓW TRYBUNALSKI - RADOMSKO (Yellow)

ŁÓDŹ – TOMASZÓW MAZOWIECKI (Pink)

Tickets

References

External links 
  Łódzka Kolej Aglomeracyjna Home Page (Polish) http://lka.lodzkie.pl/ 
 UITP.org http://www.ceec.uitp.org/%C5%82ka-new-rsr-operator-poland

Railway companies of Poland
Transport in Łódź
Companies based in Łódź
Railway companies established in 2010